Alafranga and alaturca are musical and cultural concepts specific to the Ottoman Empire and its people. The terms describe a distinction between Western culture and Eastern culture in the Balkans. They are also associated with the old-fashioned (alaturca) and the modern (alafranga). The labels are now considered outdated, but are useful in understanding Ottoman and Turkish cultural history.

Historically, alafranga and alaturca were adjectives to differentiate between Western culture and Eastern culture in the context of things such as clothing, food and decor. During this time food fusion had some of its most pivotal years because of alafranga and alaturca being so intertwined. 

Alaturca and alafranga were also competing music genres in the Turkish Republic in the 1920s and 1930s, after the Ottoman Empire was dissolved. Alaturka was associated with the classical music of the Ottoman Empire, while alafranga was associated with European classical music, along with other western music forms penetrating the country.
 Alafranga is music or other cultural expression in a western or European style. It was seen in the 18th century as "exemplifying modernist ideas and trends". Term comes from Italitan "alla franca".
 Alaturka is music or other cultural expression in a traditional Turkish style. It was seen in the 19th century as "exemplifying backward-looking traditionalism"—the opposite of alafranga. From Italitan, "à la Turk" or "alla turca"

Western references
 David Brubeck referred to the Turkish people in the title to his tune Blue Rondo à la Turk. Brubeck heard an unusual rhythm performed by Turkish musicians on the street. Upon asking the musicians where they got the rhythm, one replied "This rhythm is to us what the blues is to you." He named the piece for them.

Ottoman references 

 Ahmet Mithat: Felatun Bey and Rakım Efendi: This Ottoman novel defines alafranga and alaturka as, "The term alafranga is French-Ottoman composite of the French "à la" and "franga", meaning "Frank" or "European" more generally. Alafranga thus means "in a European mode". The term alaturka follows the same French-Ottoman composite pattern and conversely means "in a Turkish or Ottoman mode".

References

See also
 Alaturka: Style in Turkish Music (1923–1938) by John Morgan O'Connell, Cardiff University, UK, SOAS Musicology Series

Balkan culture
Ottoman culture
Cultural history of Turkey